Prince Albert of Saxe-Coburg and Gotha (Franz August Karl Albert Emanuel; 26 August 1819 – 14 December 1861) was consort of the British monarch as the husband of Queen Victoria from their marriage on 10 February 1840 until his death in 1861.

Albert was born in the Saxon duchy of Saxe-Coburg-Saalfeld to a family connected to many of Europe's ruling monarchs. At the age of 20, he married his cousin Victoria; they had nine children. Initially he felt constrained by his role as consort, which did not afford him power or responsibilities. He gradually developed a reputation for supporting public causes, such as educational reform and the abolition of slavery worldwide, and was entrusted with running the Queen's household, office, and estates. He was heavily involved with the organisation of the Great Exhibition of 1851, which was a resounding success.

Victoria came to depend more and more on Albert's support and guidance. He aided the development of Britain's constitutional monarchy by persuading his wife to be less partisan in her dealings with Parliament—although he actively disagreed with the interventionist foreign policy pursued during Lord Palmerston's tenure as Foreign Secretary. Albert died in 1861 at age 42, devastating Victoria so much that she entered into a deep state of mourning and wore black for the rest of her life. On her death in 1901, their eldest son succeeded as Edward VII, the first British monarch of the House of Saxe-Coburg and Gotha, named after the ducal house to which Albert belonged.

Early life 

Prince Albert was born on 26 August 1819, at Schloss Rosenau, near Coburg, Germany, the second son of Ernest III, Duke of Saxe-Coburg-Saalfeld, and his first wife, Louise of Saxe-Gotha-Altenburg. His first cousin and future wife, Victoria, was born earlier in the same year with the assistance of the same accoucheuse, Charlotte von Siebold. He was baptised into the Lutheran Evangelical Church on 19 September 1819 in the Marble Hall at Schloss Rosenau, with water taken from the local river, the Itz. His godparents were his paternal grandmother, the Dowager Duchess of Saxe-Coburg-Saalfeld; his maternal grandfather, the Duke of Saxe-Gotha-Altenburg; the Emperor of Austria; the Duke of Teschen; and Emanuel, Count of Mensdorff-Pouilly. In 1825, Albert's great-uncle, Frederick IV, Duke of Saxe-Gotha-Altenburg, died, which led to a realignment of the Saxon duchies the following year and Albert's father became the first reigning duke of Saxe-Coburg and Gotha.

Albert and his elder brother, Ernest, spent their youth in close companionship, which was marred by their parents' turbulent marriage and eventual separation and divorce. After their mother was exiled from court in 1824, she married her lover, Alexander von Hanstein, Count of Pölzig and Beiersdorf. She presumably never saw her children again, and died of cancer at the age of 30 in 1831. The following year, their father married his niece Princess Marie of Württemberg; their marriage was not close, however, and Marie had little—if any—impact on her stepsons' lives.

The brothers were educated privately at home by Christoph Florschütz and later studied in Brussels, where Adolphe Quetelet was one of their tutors. Like many other German princes, Albert attended the University of Bonn, where he studied law, political economy, philosophy and the history of art. He played music and he excelled at sport, especially fencing and riding. His tutors at Bonn included the philosopher Fichte and the poet Schlegel.

Marriage 

The idea of marriage between Albert and his cousin Victoria was first documented in an 1821 letter from his paternal grandmother, the Dowager Duchess of Saxe-Coburg-Saalfeld, who said that he was "the pendant to the pretty cousin". By 1836, this idea had also arisen in the mind of their ambitious uncle Leopold, who had been King of the Belgians since 1831. At this time, Victoria was the heir presumptive to the British throne. Her father, Prince Edward, Duke of Kent and Strathearn, the fourth son of King George III, had died when she was an infant, and her elderly uncle, King William IV, had no surviving legitimate children. Her mother, the Duchess of Kent, was the sister of both Albert's father—the Duke of Saxe-Coburg and Gotha—and King Leopold. Leopold arranged for his sister, Victoria's mother, to invite the Duke of Saxe-Coburg and Gotha and his two sons to visit her in May 1836, with the purpose of meeting Victoria. William IV, however, disapproved of any match with the Coburgs, and instead favoured the suit of Prince Alexander, second son of the Prince of Orange. Victoria was well aware of the various matrimonial plans and critically appraised a parade of eligible princes. She wrote, "[Albert] is extremely handsome; his hair is about the same colour as mine; his eyes are large and blue, and he has a beautiful nose and a very sweet mouth with fine teeth; but the charm of his countenance is his expression, which is most delightful." Alexander, on the other hand, she described as "very plain".

Victoria wrote to her uncle Leopold to thank him "for the prospect of great happiness you have contributed to give me, in the person of dear Albert ... He possesses every quality that could be desired to render me perfectly happy." Although the parties did not undertake a formal engagement, both the family and their retainers widely assumed that the match would take place.

Victoria came to the throne aged eighteen on 20 June 1837. Her letters of the time show interest in Albert's education for the role he would have to play, although she resisted attempts to rush her into marriage. In the winter of 1838–39, the prince visited Italy, accompanied by the Coburg family's confidential adviser, Baron Stockmar.

Albert returned to the United Kingdom with Ernest in October 1839 to visit the Queen, with the objective of settling the marriage. Albert and Victoria felt mutual affection and the Queen proposed to him on 15 October 1839. Victoria's intention to marry was declared formally to the Privy Council on 23 November, and the couple married on 10 February 1840 at the Chapel Royal, St James's Palace. Just before the marriage, Albert was naturalised by Act of Parliament, and granted the style of Royal Highness by an Order in Council.

Initially Albert was not popular with the British public; he was perceived to be from an impoverished and undistinguished minor state, barely larger than a small English county. The British Prime Minister, Lord Melbourne, advised the Queen against granting her husband the title of "King Consort"; Parliament also objected to Albert being created a peer—partly because of anti-German sentiment and a desire to exclude Albert from any political role. Albert's religious views provided a small amount of controversy when the marriage was debated in Parliament: although as a member of the Lutheran Evangelical Church Albert was a Protestant, the non-Episcopal nature of his church was considered worrisome. Of greater concern, however, was that some of Albert's family were Roman Catholic. Melbourne led a minority government and the opposition took advantage of the marriage to weaken his position further. They opposed a British peerage for Albert and granted him a smaller annuity than previous consorts, £30,000 instead of the usual £50,000. Albert claimed that he had no need of a British peerage, writing: "It would almost be a step downwards, for as a Duke of Saxony, I feel myself much higher than a Duke of York or Kent." For the next seventeen years, Albert was formally titled "HRH Prince Albert" until, on 25 June 1857, Victoria formally granted him the title Prince Consort. Victoria explained, in a letter to Lord Palmerston on 15 March 1857, that she was: "... inclined ... to content herself by simply giving her husband by Letters Patent the title of 'Prince Consort' which can injure no one while it will give him an English title consistent with his position, & avoid his being treated by Foreign Courts as a junior Member of the house of Saxe-Coburg".

Consort of the Queen 

The position in which Albert was placed by his marriage, while one of distinction, also offered considerable difficulties; in his own words, "I am very happy and contented; but the difficulty in filling my place with the proper dignity is that I am only the husband, not the master in the house." The Queen's household was run by her former governess, Baroness Lehzen. Albert referred to her as the "House Dragon", and manoeuvred to dislodge the Baroness from her position.

Within two months of the marriage, Victoria was pregnant. Albert started to take on public roles; he became President of the Society for the Extinction of Slavery (which was still lawful in most parts of the world beyond the British Empire); and helped Victoria privately with her government paperwork.

In June 1840, while on a public carriage ride, Albert and the pregnant Victoria were shot at by Edward Oxford, who was later judged insane. Neither Albert nor Victoria was hurt and Albert was praised in the newspapers for his courage and coolness during the attack. He was gaining public support as well as political influence, which showed itself practically when, in August, Parliament passed the Regency Act 1840 to designate him regent in the event of Victoria's death before their child reached the age of majority. Their first child, Victoria, named after her mother, was born in November. Eight other children would follow over the next seventeen years. All nine children survived to adulthood, which was remarkable for the era and which biographer Hermione Hobhouse credited to Albert's "enlightened influence" on the healthy running of the nursery. In early 1841, he successfully removed the nursery from Lehzen's pervasive control, and in September 1842, Lehzen left Britain permanently—much to Albert's relief.

After the 1841 general election, Melbourne was replaced as Prime Minister by Sir Robert Peel, who appointed Albert as chairman of the Royal Commission in charge of redecorating the new Palace of Westminster. The Palace had burned down seven years before, and was being rebuilt. As a patron and purchaser of pictures and sculpture, the commission was set up to promote the fine arts in Britain. The commission's work was slow, and the palace's architect, Charles Barry, took many decisions out of the commissioners' hands by decorating rooms with ornate furnishings that were treated as part of the architecture. Albert was more successful as a private patron and collector. Among his notable purchases were early German and Italian paintings—such as Lucas Cranach the Elder's Apollo and Diana and Fra Angelico's St Peter Martyr—and contemporary pieces from Franz Xaver Winterhalter and Edwin Landseer. Ludwig Gruner, of Dresden, assisted Albert in buying artworks of the highest quality.

Albert and Victoria were shot at again on both 29 and 30 May 1842, but were unhurt. The culprit, John Francis, was detained and condemned to death, although he was later reprieved. Some of their early unpopularity came about because of their stiffness and adherence to protocol in public, though in private the couple were more easy-going. In early 1844, Victoria and Albert were apart for the first time since their marriage when he returned to Coburg on the death of his father.

By 1844, Albert had managed to modernise the royal finances and, through various economies, had sufficient capital to purchase Osborne House on the Isle of Wight as a private residence for their growing family. Over the next few years a house modelled in the style of an Italianate villa was built to the designs of Albert and Thomas Cubitt. Albert laid out the grounds, and improved the estate and farm. Albert managed and improved the other royal estates; his model farm at Windsor (Shaw Farm) was admired by his biographers, and under his stewardship the revenues of the Duchy of Cornwall—the hereditary property of the Prince of Wales—steadily increased.

Unlike many landowners who approved of child labour and opposed Peel's repeal of the Corn Laws, Albert supported moves to raise working ages and free up trade. In 1846, Albert was rebuked by Lord George Bentinck when he attended the debate on the Corn Laws in the House of Commons to give tacit support to Peel. During Peel's premiership, Albert's authority behind, or beside, the throne became more apparent. He had access to all the Queen's papers, was drafting her correspondence and was present when she met her ministers; he would even see them alone in her absence. The clerk of the Privy Council, Charles Greville, wrote of him: "He is King to all intents and purposes."

In 1847, Victoria and Albert spent a rainy holiday in the west of Scotland at Loch Laggan, but heard from their doctor, Sir James Clark, that Clark's son had enjoyed dry, sunny days farther east at Balmoral Castle. The tenant of Balmoral, Sir Robert Gordon, died suddenly in early October, and Albert began negotiations to take over the lease from the owner, the Earl Fife. In May the following year, Albert leased Balmoral, which he had never visited. In September 1848 he, his wife and their older children went there for the first time. They came to relish the privacy it afforded.

Reformer and innovator

Foreign affairs
Revolutions spread throughout Europe in 1848 as the result of a widespread economic crisis. Throughout the year, Victoria and Albert complained about Foreign Secretary Palmerston's independent foreign policy, which they believed further destabilised continental European powers. Albert was concerned for many of his royal relatives, a number of whom were deposed by revolutionaries. He and Victoria, who gave birth to their daughter Louise during that year, spent some time away from London in the relative safety of Osborne. Although there were sporadic demonstrations in England, no effective revolutionary action took place.

Domestic reforms 
According to historian G. M. Trevelyan, regarding the Prince and home affairs: 

In 1847, Albert was elected Chancellor of the University of Cambridge after a close contest with the Earl of Powis. He used his position as chancellor to campaign successfully for reformed and more modern university curricula, expanding the subjects taught beyond the traditional mathematics and classics to include modern history and the natural sciences.

Albert gained public acclaim when he expressed paternalistic, yet well-meaning and philanthropic, views. In an 1848 speech to the Society for the Improvement of the Condition of the Labouring Classes, of which he was president, he expressed his "sympathy and interest for that class of our community who have most of the toil and fewest of the enjoyments of this world". It was the "duty of those who, under the blessings of Divine Providence, enjoy station, wealth, and education" to assist those less fortunate than themselves.

His progressive and relatively liberal ideas were expressed by his support of emancipation, technological progress, science education, the ideas of Charles Darwin, and the welfare of the working classes. Albert led reforms in university education, welfare and the royal finances and supported the campaign against slavery. He also had a special interest in applying science and art to manufacturing industry.

The Great Exhibition of 1851 arose from the annual exhibitions of the Society of Arts, of which Albert was president from 1843, and owed most of its success to his efforts to promote it. Albert served as president of the Royal Commission for the Exhibition of 1851, and had to fight for every stage of the project. In the House of Lords, Lord Brougham fulminated against the proposal to hold the exhibition in Hyde Park. Opponents of the exhibition prophesied that foreign rogues and revolutionists would overrun England, subvert the morals of the people, and destroy their faith. Albert thought such talk absurd and quietly persevered, trusting always that British manufacturing would benefit from exposure to the best products of foreign countries.

The Queen opened the exhibition in a specially designed and built glass building known as the Crystal Palace on 1 May 1851. It proved a colossal success. A surplus of £180,000 was used to purchase land in South Kensington on which to establish educational and cultural institutions—including the Natural History Museum, Science Museum, Imperial College London and what would later be named the Royal Albert Hall and the Victoria and Albert Museum. The area was referred to as "Albertopolis" by sceptics.

Family and public life (1852–1859) 

In 1852, John Camden Neild, an eccentric miser, left Victoria an unexpected legacy, which Albert used to obtain the freehold of Balmoral. As usual, he embarked on an extensive programme of improvements. The same year, he was appointed to several of the offices left vacant by the death of the Duke of Wellington, including the mastership of Trinity House and the colonelcy of the Grenadier Guards. With Wellington's passing, Albert was able to propose and campaign for modernisation of the army, which was long overdue. Thinking that the military was unready for war, and that Christian rule was preferable to Islamic rule, Albert counselled a diplomatic solution to conflict between the Russian and Ottoman empires. Palmerston was more bellicose, and favoured a policy that would prevent further Russian expansion. Palmerston was manoeuvred out of the cabinet in December 1853, but at about the same time a Russian fleet attacked the Ottoman fleet at anchor at Sinop. The London press depicted the attack as a criminal massacre, and Palmerston's popularity surged as Albert's fell. Within two weeks, Palmerston was re-appointed as a minister. As public outrage at the Russian action continued, false rumours circulated that Albert had been arrested for treason and was being held prisoner in the Tower of London.

By March 1854, Britain and Russia were embroiled in the Crimean War. Albert devised a master plan for winning the war by laying siege to Sevastopol while starving Russia economically, which became the Allied strategy after the Tsar decided to fight a purely defensive war. Early British optimism soon faded as the press reported that British troops were ill-equipped and mismanaged by aged generals using out-of-date tactics and strategy. The conflict dragged on as the Russians were as poorly prepared as their opponents. The Prime Minister, Lord Aberdeen, resigned and Palmerston succeeded him. A negotiated settlement eventually put an end to the war with the Treaty of Paris. During the war, Albert arranged the marriage of his fourteen-year-old daughter, Victoria, to Prince Frederick William of Prussia, though Albert delayed the marriage until Victoria was seventeen. Albert hoped that his daughter and son-in-law would be a liberalising influence in the enlarging but very conservative Prussian state.

Albert promoted many public educational institutions. Chiefly at meetings in connection with these he spoke of the need for better schooling. A collection of his speeches was published in 1857. Recognised as a supporter of education and technological progress, he was invited to speak at scientific meetings, such as the memorable address he delivered as president of the British Association for the Advancement of Science when it met at Aberdeen in 1859. His espousal of science met with clerical opposition; he and Palmerston unsuccessfully recommended a knighthood for Charles Darwin, after the publication of On the Origin of Species, which was opposed by the Bishop of Oxford.

Albert continued to devote himself to the education of his family and the management of the royal household. His children's governess, Lady Lyttelton, thought him unusually kind and patient, and described him joining in family games with enthusiasm. He felt keenly the departure of his eldest daughter for Prussia when she married her fiancé at the beginning of 1858, and was disappointed that his eldest son, the Prince of Wales, did not respond well to the intense educational programme that Albert had designed for him. At the age of seven, the Prince of Wales was expected to take six hours of instruction, including an hour of German and an hour of French every day. When the Prince of Wales failed at his lessons, Albert caned him. Corporal punishment was common at the time, and was not thought unduly harsh. Albert's biographer Roger Fulford wrote that the relationships between the family members were "friendly, affectionate and normal ... there is no evidence either in the Royal Archives or in the printed authorities to justify the belief that the relations between the Prince and his eldest son were other than deeply affectionate." Philip Magnus wrote in his biography of Albert's eldest son that Albert "tried to treat his children as equals; and they were able to penetrate his stiffness and reserve because they realised instinctively not only that he loved them but that he enjoyed and needed their company."

Albert was a talented amateur musician and composer. For his wedding, he composed a duet, Die Liebe hat uns nun vereint ("Love has now united us"). Felix Mendelssohn described Albert playing the Buckingham Palace organ "so charmingly and clearly and correctly that it would have done credit to any professional". Following tuition from George Elvey, the organist at St George's Chapel, Windsor, Albert composed several choral pieces for Anglican worship, including settings of the Te Deum and Jubilate, and an anthem, Out of the Deep. His secular compositions included a cantata, L'Invocazione all'armonia, and Melody for the Violin, which Yehudi Menuhin later described as "pleasant music without presumption".

Illness and death 

In August 1859, Albert fell seriously ill with stomach cramps. His steadily worsening medical condition led to a sense of despair; biographer Robert Rhodes James describes Albert as having lost "the will to live". Albert later had an accidental brush with death during a trip to Coburg in October 1860, when he was driving alone in a carriage drawn by four horses that suddenly bolted. As the horses continued to gallop toward a wagon waiting at a railway crossing, Albert jumped for his life from the carriage. One of the horses was killed in the collision, and Albert was badly shaken, though his only physical injuries were cuts and bruises. He confided in his brother and eldest daughter that he had sensed his time had come.

Victoria's mother and Albert's aunt, the Duchess of Kent, died in March 1861, and Victoria was grief-stricken. Albert took on most of the Queen's duties despite his continuing chronic stomach trouble. The last public event over which he presided was the opening of the Royal Horticultural Gardens on 5 June 1861. In August, Victoria and Albert visited the Curragh Camp, Ireland, where the Prince of Wales was attending army manoeuvres. At the Curragh, the Prince of Wales was introduced, by his fellow officers, to Nellie Clifden, an Irish actress.

By November, Victoria and Albert had returned to Windsor, and the Prince of Wales had returned to Cambridge, where he was a student. Two of Albert's young cousins, brothers King Pedro V of Portugal and Prince Ferdinand, died of typhoid fever within five days of each other in early November. On top of this news, Albert was informed that gossip was spreading in gentlemen's clubs and the foreign press that the Prince of Wales was involved with Nellie Clifden. Albert and Victoria were horrified by their son's indiscretion, and feared blackmail, scandal or pregnancy. Although Albert was ill and at a low ebb, he travelled to Cambridge to see the Prince of Wales on 25 November and discuss his indiscreet affair. In his final weeks Albert suffered from pains in his back and legs.

Also in November 1861, the Trent affair—the forcible removal of Confederate envoys from a British ship, the RMS Trent, by Union forces during the American Civil War—threatened war between the United States and Britain. The British government prepared an ultimatum and readied a military response. Albert was gravely ill but intervened to defuse the crisis. In a few hours, he revised the British demands in a manner that allowed the Lincoln administration to surrender the Confederate commissioners who had been seized from the Trent and to issue a public apology to London without losing face. The key idea, based on a suggestion from The Times, was to give Washington the opportunity to deny it had officially authorised the seizure and thereby apologise for the captain's mistake.

On 9 December, one of Albert's doctors, William Jenner, diagnosed him with typhoid fever. Albert died at 10:50 p.m. on 14 December 1861 in the Blue Room at Windsor Castle, in the presence of the Queen and five of their nine children. He was 42 years old. The contemporary diagnosis was typhoid fever, but modern writers have pointed out that Albert's ongoing stomach pain, leaving him ill for at least two years before his death, may indicate that a chronic disease, such as Crohn's disease, kidney failure, or abdominal cancer, was the cause of death.

Legacy 

The Queen's grief was overwhelming, and the tepid feelings the public had previously for Albert were replaced by sympathy. The widowed Victoria never recovered from Albert's death; she entered into a deep state of mourning and wore black for the rest of her life. Albert's rooms in all his houses were kept as they had been, even with hot water brought in the morning and linen and towels changed daily. Such practices were not uncommon in the houses of the very rich. Victoria withdrew from public life and her seclusion eroded some of Albert's work in attempting to re-model the monarchy as a national institution setting a moral, if not political, example. Albert is credited with introducing the principle that the British royal family should remain above politics. Before his marriage to Victoria, she supported the Whigs; for example, early in her reign Victoria managed to thwart the formation of a Tory government by Sir Robert Peel by refusing to accept substitutions which Peel wanted to make among her ladies-in-waiting.

Albert's body was temporarily entombed in St George's Chapel, Windsor Castle. A year after his death his remains were deposited at the Royal Mausoleum, Frogmore, which remained incomplete until 1871. The sarcophagus, in which both he and the Queen were eventually laid, was carved from the largest block of granite that had ever been quarried in Britain. Despite Albert's request that no effigies of him should be raised, many public monuments were erected all over the country and across the British Empire. The most notable are the Royal Albert Hall and the Albert Memorial in London. The plethora of memorials erected to Albert became so great that Charles Dickens told a friend that he sought an "inaccessible cave" to escape from them.

Places and objects named after Albert range from Lake Albert in Africa to the city of Prince Albert, Saskatchewan, to the Albert Medal presented by the Royal Society of Arts. Four regiments of the British Army were named after him: 11th (Prince Albert's Own) Hussars; Prince Albert's Light Infantry; Prince Albert's Own Leicestershire Regiment of Yeomanry Cavalry; and The Prince Consort's Own Rifle Brigade. He and Queen Victoria showed a keen interest in the establishment and development of Aldershot in Hampshire as a garrison town in the 1850s. They had a wooden Royal Pavilion built there in which they would often stay when attending military reviews. Albert established and endowed the Prince Consort's Library at Aldershot, which still exists today. In 1851, botanist John Lindley named a tree from Patagonia, Saxegothaea after one of the Prince's titles, with the Prince's permission.

Biographies published after his death were typically heavy on eulogy. Theodore Martin's five-volume magnum opus was authorised and supervised by Queen Victoria, and her influence shows in its pages. Nevertheless, it is an accurate and exhaustive account. Lytton Strachey's Queen Victoria (1921) was more critical, but it was discredited in part by mid-twentieth-century biographers such as Hector Bolitho and Roger Fulford, who (unlike Strachey) had access to Victoria's journal and letters. Popular myths about Prince Albert—such as the claim that he introduced Christmas trees to Britain—are dismissed by scholars. Recent biographers such as Stanley Weintraub portray Albert as a figure in a tragic romance who died too soon and was mourned by his lover for a lifetime. In the 2009 film The Young Victoria, Albert, played by Rupert Friend, is made into a heroic character; in the fictionalised depiction of the 1840 shooting, he is struck by a bullet—something that did not happen in real life.

Titles, styles, honours and arms

Titles and styles 

In the United Kingdom, Albert was styled "His Serene Highness Prince Albert of Saxe-Coburg and Gotha" in the months before his marriage. He was granted the style of Royal Highness on 6 February 1840, and given the title of Prince Consort on 25 June 1857.

British honours 
 KG: Royal Knight of the Garter, 16 December 1839
 GCB: Knight Grand Cross of the Bath (military), 6 March 1840; Great Master, 25 May 1847
 GCMG: Knight Grand Cross of St Michael and St George, 15 January 1842
 KT: Knight of the Thistle, 17 January 1842
 KP: Extra and Principal Knight of St. Patrick, 20 January 1842
 KSI: Extra Knight of the Star of India, 25 June 1861

Military appointments 
 Field Marshal of the British Army, 8 February 1840
 Colonel-in-chief of the 11th (Prince Albert's Own) Hussars, 30 April 1840 – 1842
 Colonel of the Scots Fusilier Guards, 25 April 1842 – 1852
 Captain-general and Colonel of the Honourable Artillery Company, 1843
 Constable and Governor of Windsor Castle, 1843
 Colonel-in-chief of the 60th (The King's Royal Rifle Corps) Regiment of Foot, 15 August 1850 – 1852
 Colonel of the 1st Grenadier Guards, 23 August 1852
 Colonel-in-chief of the Rifle Brigade, 23 September 1852

Foreign honours

Arms 

Upon his marriage to Queen Victoria in 1840, Prince Albert received a personal grant of arms, being the royal coat of arms of the United Kingdom differenced by a white three-point label with a red cross in the centre, quartered with his ancestral arms of Saxony. They are blazoned: "Quarterly, 1st and 4th, the Royal Arms, with overall a label of three points Argent charged on the centre with cross Gules; 2nd and 3rd, Barry of ten Or and Sable, a crown of rue in bend Vert". The arms are unusual, being described by S. T. Aveling as a "singular example of quartering differenced arms, [which] is not in accordance with the rules of Heraldry, and is in itself an heraldic contradiction." Prior to his marriage Albert used the arms of his father undifferenced, in accordance with German custom.

Albert's Garter stall plate displays his arms surmounted by a royal crown with six crests for the House of Saxe-Coburg and Gotha; these are from left to right: 1. "A bull's head caboshed Gules armed and ringed Argent, crowned Or, the rim chequy Gules and Argent" for Mark. 2. "Out of a coronet Or, two buffalo horns Argent, attached to the outer edge of five branches fesswise each with three linden leaves Vert" for Thuringia. 3. "Out of a coronet Or, a pyramidal chapeau charged with the arms of Saxony ensigned by a plume of peacock feathers Proper out of a coronet also Or" for Saxony. 4. "A bearded man in profile couped below the shoulders clothed paly Argent and Gules, the pointed coronet similarly paly terminating in a plume of three peacock feathers" for Meissen. 5. "A demi griffin displayed Or, winged Sable, collared and langued Gules" for Jülich. 6. "Out of a coronet Or, a panache of peacock feathers Proper" for Berg.
The supporters were the crowned lion of England and the unicorn of Scotland (as in the Royal Arms) charged on the shoulder with a label as in the arms. Albert's personal motto is the German  (Loyal and Sure). This motto was also used by Prince Albert's Own or the 11th Hussars.

Issue 

Prince Albert's 42 grandchildren included four reigning monarchs: King George V of the United Kingdom; Wilhelm II, German Emperor; Ernest Louis, Grand Duke of Hesse; and Charles Edward, Duke of Saxe-Coburg and Gotha, and five consorts of monarchs: Empress Alexandra of Russia and Queens Maud of Norway, Sophia of Greece, Victoria Eugenie of Spain, and Marie of Romania. Albert's many descendants include royalty and nobility throughout Europe.

Ancestry

See also 
 John Brown
 List of coupled cousins
 Royal Albert Memorial Museum

Notes

References

Sources

Further reading
 Eyck, Frank. The Prince Consort: a political biography (Chatto, 1959), a scholarly study online.
 Haspel, Paul. "England's Unsung Hero of the American Civil War" North & South: The Official Magazine of the Civil War Society (July 2007), 10#2 pp 48–52; how Prince Albert aided the peaceful resolution of the 'Trent' affair in 1861. 
 Hough, Richard. Victoria & Albert: Their Love & Their Tragedies (1996)
 Lalumia, Christine. "Scrooge and Albert" History Today (2001) 51#12 pp. 23–29.
 LeMay, G. H. L. "Prince Albert and the British Constitution" History Today (1953) 3#6 pp. 411–416.
 Rappaport, Helen. Magnificent obsession: Victoria, Albert and the death that changed the monarchy (Random House, 2011).
 Walton, Oliver. "Distant patron: Prince Albert and the Development of the Coburg-Gotha Economy." Acta Oeconomica Pragensia 2008.1 (2008): 117–130. online

External links 

 Prince Albert at the official website of the British monarchy
 Prince Albert at the official website of the Royal Collection Trust
 
 
 
 Prince Albert (1819–1861), BBC History
 UK Parliamentary Archives, Oaths of Prince Albert, Duke of Saxe, Prince of Saxe Coburg and Gotha 

|-

 
1819 births
1861 deaths
People from Coburg
House of Saxe-Coburg and Gotha (United Kingdom)
Princes of Saxe-Coburg and Gotha
Princes of the United Kingdom
19th-century British people
11th Hussars officers
British field marshals
British royal consorts
German Protestants
British Protestants
Chancellors of the University of Cambridge
German emigrants to the United Kingdom
Grenadier Guards officers
Honorary Fellows of the Royal Society of Edinburgh
Presidents of the Zoological Society of London
Members of the Privy Council of the United Kingdom
Presidents of the British Science Association
Queen Victoria
Scots Guards officers
University of Bonn alumni
Royal reburials
Sons of monarchs

Knights of the Garter
Knights Grand Cross of the Order of the Bath
Great Masters of the Order of the Bath
Knights of the Thistle
Knights of St Patrick
Knights Grand Cross of the Order of St Michael and St George
Knights Companion of the Order of the Star of India
Grand Crosses of the Order of Saint Stephen of Hungary
Knights of the Golden Fleece of Spain
Grand Croix of the Légion d'honneur
Bailiffs Grand Cross of Honour and Devotion of the Sovereign Military Order of Malta
3
3
3
Recipients of the Order of the Tower and Sword
Recipients of the Order of the White Eagle (Russia)
Recipients of the Order of St. Anna, 1st class
Recipients of the Order of the Medjidie, 1st class
Recipients of the Order of the Netherlands Lion
Members of Trinity House
Non-inheriting heirs presumptive